Stanley Chukwudi Oganbor (born 10 July 1998) is a Nigerian footballer who plays as a forward.

Career

FC Tulsa
On 9 February 2021, Oganbor signed with USL Championship side FC Tulsa. He made his debut on 2 June 2021, appearing as a 72nd-minute substitute during a 4–1 loss to Sporting Kansas City II.

References

External links 

1998 births
Living people
Association football forwards
Residents of Lagos
Nigerian footballers
Nigerian expatriate sportspeople in Slovenia
Nigerian expatriate sportspeople in the United States
Nigerian expatriate footballers
Expatriate footballers in Slovenia
Expatriate soccer players in the United States
FK Inter Bratislava players
FC Tulsa players
USL Championship players